One Time for All Time is the second studio album by the instrumental post-rock band 65daysofstatic, released on October 24, 2005 on Monotreme.

"Radio Protector" was released as a 7" single in February 2006 on Monotreme Records. The band have stated on their website that this will be the only single release from the album.

Track listing
"Drove Through Ghosts to Get Here" – 4:18
"Await Rescue" – 4:44
"23kid" – 4:32
"Welcome to the Times" – 3:53
"Mean Low Water" – 4:00
"Climbing on Roofs (DeSperate Edit)" – 2:27
"The Big Afraid" – 2:08
"65 Doesn't Understand You" – 5:36
"Radio Protector" – 5:26

Bonus tracks on Japanese release (previously released on Retreat! Retreat! single)
 "AOD" – 6:15
 "The Major Cities of the World Are Being Destroyed One By One By the Monsters" – 4:09

References

External links

2005 albums
65daysofstatic albums
Music in Sheffield